Acanthicus adonis, the adonis pleco or polka dot lyre-tail pleco, is a large species of armored catfish. It was originally described from the lower Tocantins River in Brazil, but individuals resembling the species have also been recorded from Amazonian Peru.<ref name=Chamon2016>Chamon, C.C. (2016): Redescription of Acanthicus hystrix Agassiz, 1829 (Siluriformes: Loricariidae), with comments on the systematics and distribution of the genus. Zootaxa, 4088 (3): 395–408.</ref> The species is occasionally seen in the aquarium trade, but its massive adult size and territorially aggressive behavior means that a very large tank is required. These fish are opportunistic omnivores.

It is dark brown to black with numerous white spots as a juvenile. As the fish matures, the spots become less numerous and smaller, often disappearing entirely in large adults. Its close relative A. hystrix always lack white spots, regardless of age. In contrast, A. adonis lacks the vermiculated pattern often (but not always) found on the underparts of A. hystrix''.

References 

Ancistrini
Catfish of South America
Freshwater fish of Brazil
Fish of the Amazon basin
Fish described in 1988